Estonia competed at the 2019 World Athletics Championships in Doha, Qatar, from 27 September to 6 October 2019.

Medalists

Results

Men
Track and road events

Field events

Combined events – Decathlon

References

External links
Estonia – IAAF World Athletics Championships, Doha 2019 iaaf.org

Nations at the 2019 World Athletics Championships
World Championships in Athletics
2019